Guillaume Le Bé (1525–1598) was a French punchcutter and engraver who specialised in Hebrew typefaces. 

He was born in Troyes to a notable family of paper merchants and apprenticed to Robert Estienne in Paris. After completing his apprenticeship, he was active in Venice from c. 1540 to 1550, where he produced Hebrew, Latin and Greek types for various printer/publishers, notably Marc'Antonio Giustiniani, Carlo Querini and Meir di Parenzo. 

On his return to France, he established a type foundry which lasted through two generations until the 18th century. Le Bé supplied types to Christophe Plantin in Antwerp and left two annotated scrapbooks of his and other typefaces, which are now in the Bibliothèque Nationale in Paris.

The typographical symbol guillemet is named after him.

See also
 France-Asia relations

References

16th-century printers
1525 births
1598 deaths
People from Troyes
16th-century French businesspeople